Rome is regarded as one of the world's most beautiful ancient cities, and contains vast amounts of priceless works of art, palaces, museums, parks, churches, gardens, basilicas, temples, villas, piazzas, theatres, and other venues in general. As one of the world's most important and visited cities, there are numerous popular tourist attractions. In 2005, the city received 19.5 million global visitors, up of 22.1% from 2001. The 5 most visited places in Rome are: #1 Pantheon (8 million tourists a year), #2 The Colosseum (7.036.104 tourists a year), #3 Trevi Fountain (3.5 million tourists a year), #4 Sistine Chapel (3 million tourists a year) and #5 The Roman Forum (2.5 million tourists a year). The study was conducted by the Ministero dei Beni e della Attivita' Culturali e del Turismo (MIBACT) for the year 2017. Rome is the city with the most monuments in the world.

List

Religious edifices

Secular edifices, parks, public spaces and monuments

Classical and ancient Roman sites

See also
 List of fountains in Rome
 List of tourist attractions worldwide

References

Sources
  ( Page 48)

 01
.
Tourist attractions
Rome
Metropolitan City of Rome Capital
Tourist attractions in Lazio
Rome